Rachel Morgan Hill (born April 17, 1995) is an American professional soccer player who plays as a forward for San Diego Wave FC in the NWSL.

Early life
Hill has two brothers, Zach and Jake, and played indoor soccer with them on a team coached by her father, Mike.

ROSO Soccer Club
Hill played youth soccer from age 4 until U14 with ROSO S.C. (Rollinsford Somersworth Soccer Club).  She started in the town recreation program and at age 11 started playing travel soccer with the ROSO U13 Girls travel team in 2005 and played with ROSO until 2008.

Seacoast United
Hill played youth soccer for Seacoast United from their U-14 program through U-18, winning Super Y-League national championships in 2009 (U-14) and 2011 (U-16) and playing for the WPSL Seacoast United Phantoms in 2012 and 2013.

University of Connecticut
Hill was a two-time semi-finalist for the MAC Hermann Trophy as a forward for the University of Connecticut Huskies, in 2015 and 2016. Hill was a 1st Team NSCAA All-American in 2015 and a 2nd team All-American in 2016.  She scored 61 goals in 89 collegiate appearances, ranking second all-time in career goals and 4th all time in points with 140 among University of Connecticut women's soccer players.   She was the American Athletic Conference (AAC) midfielder of the year in 2016 and Offensive player of the year in 2015 & 2014.

Club career

Orlando Pride, 2017–2019
Portland Thorns FC selected Hill with the 14th pick in the 2017 NWSL College Draft and subsequently traded her to the Orlando Pride in exchange for first- and fourth-round picks in the 2018 NWSL College Draft. The Pride signed Hill in May 2017 after her college graduation, and she earned her first start on June 3.

Hill scored her first professional goal on June 28, 2017, a game-winner against Sky Blue FC.  She finished her rookie season with three goals, one assist from only 14 games, 8 of which were starts.  After her contract option exercised for 2018, Hill went on to play 21 games in 2018, but a nagging injury lead to her starting only seven of them. She scored four goals tying Marta as third best for the Pride. Hill had a new contract offer given at the end of the 2018 season.

Perth Glory, 2017–2019 (loan)
On October 19, 2017, Hill joined Australian club Perth Glory on loan for the 2017–18 W-League season.  During her first season at Perth she finished with 9 goals, the third-most goals in the league and 6 assists, the most assists in the league.

She re-signed a loan agreement for 2018–2019 and ended the season with a further 6 goals as the team finished runners up in the Grand Final.

Chicago Red Stars, 2020–present
On January 16, 2020, Orlando traded Hill to the Chicago Red Stars during the 2020 NWSL College Draft along with a third-round pick, Orlando's natural first-round selection in the 2021 NWSL College Draft and an undisclosed amount of allocation money in exchange for the No. 3 overall selection and a third-round pick in the 2020 draft. With the season disrupted by the COVID-19 pandemic, Hill eventually made her Red Stars debut during the 2020 NWSL Challenge Cup.

Linköpings FC, 2020 (loan)
In August 2020, Hill joined Swedish Damallsvenskan club Linköpings FC on loan.

Career statistics

Club

International career

United States U-20 Women's National Team
Hill appeared for the United States U-20 women's national soccer team in the 2014 FIFA U-20 Women's World Cup as a substitute against Brazil in group play.

Hill appeared for the U-20 USWNT in five CONCACAF Women's U-20 Championship matches in 2014, starting in four matches, scoring one goal, and leading the team with five assists as an attacking midfielder.

United States U-23 Women's National Team
US Soccer called Hill up to the U-23 national team in 2016 U-23 Women's Nordic Tournament in June 2016 against England, Norway, and Sweden, a tournament that the United States won.

References

External links
 Orlando Pride player profile
 University of Connecticut player profile 
 US Soccer player profile
 

Living people
1995 births
People from Rollinsford, New Hampshire
Sportspeople from Strafford County, New Hampshire
Soccer players from New Hampshire
American women's soccer players
UConn Huskies women's soccer players
Portland Thorns FC draft picks
Orlando Pride players
Perth Glory FC (A-League Women) players
National Women's Soccer League players
A-League Women players
Women's association football forwards
United States women's under-20 international soccer players
Chicago Red Stars players
Linköpings FC players
Damallsvenskan players
American expatriate women's soccer players
Expatriate women's footballers in Sweden
Expatriate women's soccer players in Australia
American expatriate sportspeople in Sweden
American expatriate sportspeople in Australia